Vitaliy Volodymyrovych Havrysh (born 18 March 1986) is a Ukrainian retired professional football defender.

Career

Desna Chernihiv
Havrysh is the product of the FC Desna Chernihiv School System. He started his professional career on 18 May 2003 in FC Desna Chernihiv, coming on as a substitute in the match against Dniprodzerzhynsk's Stal. Together with the team, Gavrish became the second in his group of the Second League twice in a row (in 2004 and 2005), although only the winners of the groups rose in the class. In addition, in 2005 he was called up to the location of the national teams of Ukraine-18 and Ukraine-19, but did not go on the field. Only on the third attempt, in 2006, Chernihiv managed to win their group and reach the First League. Here he won the Ukrainian Second League in the season 2005–06 and to get promoted to Ukrainian First League.

Metalurh Donetsk and Stal Alchevsk
In early 2007, Vitaliy moved to Metalurh Donetsk, but was immediately leased to Stal Alchevsk,  which played in the Ukrainian Premier League and finished 15th in that season and relegated to the Ukrainian First League. Vitaliy Havrysh started the next season for Metalurh Donetsk,  but in a year the midfielder played only 2 matches for the main team in the championship and 2 in the cup (1 goal), most of the time playing in the doubles tournament (28 matches, 3 goals).

Loan to Stal Alchevsk
In summer 2008, Gavrish returned to Stal Alchevsk, having played in 30 matches in Ukrainian First League with 4 goals, during the season 2008–09 Ukrainian First League season. He played for FC Hoverla Uzhhorod., but was returned to Metalurh at the end of the season. But after playing only a few control matches and one backup match, in August of that year he again went to "Steel", where he became captain of the team.

Oleksandriya
In 2012 he returned in Ukrainian Premier League Premier League, moving to Oleksandria. On 3 March 2012, he made his debut for Oleksandriya in a match against Lutsk's Volyn. On 8 April 2012, he scored his first goal for Oleksandriya in a match against Kryvyi Rih's Kryvbas, which won. Together with the club he flew from the Premier League to the First League, where he spent another six months.

Metalurh Zaporizhzhia
On 2 February 2013 he moved to Metalurh Zaporizhzhia. On 2 March 2013, he made his debut for Metalurh Zaporizhya in a match against Illichivets. In the game against the same team on 7 December 2014, Gavrish scored the first goal for the club. In summer 2015, along with seven other players, he left Metalurh Zaporizhya as a free agent.

Zirka Kropyvnytskyi
On 27 June 2016 he become a player of Zirka Kropyvnytskyi.

Kolos Kovalivka
On 29 September 2016 of the same year he signed a contract with Kolos Kovalivka. In Ukrainian First League in the season 2018-19 he played 27 matches and scored 8 goals. Havrysh become the captain of FC Kolos Kovalivka and he was recognized as the best player of May 2019 in the Ukrainian First League. With the club in the season 2020-21, he manage to get 4 place in Ukrainian Premier League and qualified for the Europa Conference League third qualifying round. On 19 December 2021 he announced his retirement from football.

Career statistics

Club

Honours
Kolos Kovalivka
 Ukrainian First League: 2018–19

Desna Chernihiv
 Ukrainian Second League: 2005–06

individual'''
 Best Player in May 2019 Ukrainian First League: 2018–19

References

External links
 
 
 
 

1986 births
Living people
Footballers from Chernihiv
Ukrainian footballers
Ukrainian Premier League players
Ukrainian First League players
Ukrainian Second League players
FC Metalurh Donetsk players
FC Stal Alchevsk players
FC Desna Chernihiv players
FC Oleksandriya players
FC Metalurh Zaporizhzhia players
FC Hoverla Uzhhorod players
FC Zirka Kropyvnytskyi players
FC Kolos Kovalivka players
Association football midfielders
Ukrainian football managers